Jan Fridthjof Bernt (born 6 July 1943) is a Norwegian professor of law and former rector (1996-1998) at the University of Bergen.

He graduated with the cand.jur. degree from the University of Oslo in 1968, with the Master of Comparative Law from the University of Michigan in 1971 and took the dr.juris degree at the University of Bergen in 1979. In 1980, he was appointed as professor of law at the University of Bergen. He was elected as rector of the university from 1996 to 1998.

He is the chairman of the Chr. Michelsen Institute and the Ludvig Holberg Memorial Fund, and a board member of Transparency International, Norway.

He is a former  of the Norwegian Academy of Science and Letters, and has been proclaimed Knight of the Order of St. Olav (2000) and Grand Knight of the Icelandic Order of the Falcon.

References

1943 births
Living people
Norwegian jurists
University of Oslo alumni
University of Michigan Law School alumni
Academic staff of the University of Bergen
Rectors of the University of Bergen
Grand Knights of the Order of the Falcon
Members of the Norwegian Academy of Science and Letters